Anastasios Tsiou is a Paralympian athlete from Greece competing mainly in category F57-58 shot put events.

He competed in the 2008 Summer Paralympics in Beijing, China. There he won a bronze medal in the men's F57-58 shot put event.

External links
 

Paralympic athletes of Greece
Athletes (track and field) at the 2008 Summer Paralympics
Paralympic bronze medalists for Greece
Living people
Year of birth missing (living people)
Place of birth missing (living people)
Medalists at the 2008 Summer Paralympics
Paralympic medalists in athletics (track and field)
21st-century Greek people